Sinan Kaloğlu (born 10 June 1981) is a Turkish former professional footballer who played as a striker and currently the manager of Süper Lig club Altay.

International career
Kaloğlu made his first appearance Turkey national team on 12 April  2006 against Azerbaijan in Tofik Bakhramov Stadium.

References

External links
 
 
 Sinan Kaloğlu at tff.org 

Living people
1981 births
People from Ovacık, Tunceli
Kurdish sportspeople
Association football forwards
Zaza_people
Turkish people of Kurdish descent
Turkish footballers
Turkey international footballers
Boluspor footballers
Göztepe S.K. footballers
Bursaspor footballers
Altay S.K. footballers
Beşiktaş J.K. footballers
VfL Bochum players
Diyarbakırspor footballers
SBV Vitesse players
Kardemir Karabükspor footballers
Antalyaspor footballers
Manisaspor footballers
Elazığspor footballers
Kayseri Erciyesspor footballers
Eredivisie players
Expatriate footballers in Germany
Turkish expatriate sportspeople in Germany
Expatriate footballers in the Netherlands
Turkish expatriate sportspeople in the Netherlands
Bundesliga players
Turkey B international footballers
Turkish expatriate footballers
Süper Lig players
Altay S.K. managers